Neil McIntosh (15 October 1920 – 18 January 1995) was an Australian rules footballer who played with Collingwood in the Victorian Football League (VFL).

Notes

External links 

Profile from Collingwood Forever

		
		

1920 births	
1995 deaths
Australian rules footballers from Victoria (Australia)		
Collingwood Football Club players
Northcote Football Club players